In pre-Columbian Aztec society, a calpulli (from Classical Nahuatl calpōlli, meaning "large house")  were commoner housing split into kin-based land holding groups in Nahua city-states, also known as altepetl.  In Spanish sources, they are termed parcialidades or barrios. The inhabitants of the calpullis were collectively responsible for different organizational and religious tasks in relation to the larger altepetl. These groups were not simply grouped based on family units; a calpulli could be created based on an extended family, being part of a similar ethnic or national background, or having similar skills and tribute demands. Because of this, calpullis were structured in a vast array of ways. This misunderstanding that calpullis were family units can be blamed on the fact that the word “family” refers to different things in English and Nahuatl. In English, family refers to blood relation, while in Nahuatl it refers to the people whom you live with.

The primary functions of the calpullis were to coordinate land use for growing crops, food production, and manufacturing tribute. Tribute was owed be each tributary unity, typically determined as a group of courses and co-residents. Tribute was paid in goods or in labor based on lists of tributaries. The most typical forms of agriculture in Aztec society were chinampas and check dam terrace farming. Chinampas were particularly effective because of their built-in drainage systems. This not only allowed for the flow of water and sediment but they also were used as a place to store the mud produced from this water and sediment. They were then able to use this mud as fertilizer for the chinampas. Tribute was a large part of Aztec society and the way in which the nobles supported themselves. The commoners were typically expected to pay tribute around four times a year and the most common item of tribute was cotton textiles. Calpullis were also places for education. Women were taught to cook, sew, care for children, and work with textiles; while they operated as the Tēlpochcalli schools for young men to learn to be warriors. Aztec warfare was extremely important and men were expected to go to battle beginning at the age of 15. Aztec warfare was organized so that men would go to fight for each of their calpullis, so they were fighting for their familial pride.

Notes

References
 
 
 
 
 
 
 
 
 

Aztec society